Ripley Township is one of eleven townships in Montgomery County, Indiana, United States. As of the 2010 census, its population was 977 and it contained 456 housing units.

History
Abijah O'Neall II House and Yount's Woolen Mill and Boarding House are listed on the National Register of Historic Places.

Geography

Cities, towns, villages
 Alamo

Unincorporated towns
 Deer Mill at 
 Hibernia at 
 Taylor Corner at 
 Yountsville at 
(This list is based on USGS data and may include former settlements.)

Cemeteries
The township contains these five cemeteries: Fruits, O'Neal, Sparks, Stonebraker and Yountsville.

Landmarks
 Shades State Park (north quarter)

School districts
 South Montgomery Community School Corporation

Political districts
 Indiana's 4th congressional district
 State House District 41
 State Senate District 23

References
 
 United States Census Bureau 2008 TIGER/Line Shapefiles
 IndianaMap

External links
 Indiana Township Association
 United Township Association of Indiana
 City-Data.com page for Ripley Township

Townships in Montgomery County, Indiana
Townships in Indiana